Sevenoaks railway station is a railway station on the South Eastern Main Line in England, serving the town of Sevenoaks, Kent. Trains calling at the station are operated by Southeastern and Thameslink.

Trains from the station run northbound to London Bridge, Cannon Street, Waterloo East and Charing Cross via Orpington, or to Blackfriars via Swanley and Catford; and southbound to Ashford International and Ramsgate via Dover Priory, or Tunbridge Wells and Hastings.

History

Sevenoaks railway station was opened on 2 March 1868. It was formerly known as "Tubs Hill", after the adjacent area. There is a second station, on the branch to Swanley Junction, which opened on 2 June 1862. The station is named after the Bat & Ball local inn which is now closed, and serves the north end of the town.

The two lines to Sevenoaks were electrified in January 1935. When the station was reconstructed in the 1970s a new ticket office was built replacing the old wooden S.E.R. building. The largest version of the Southern Region D70 type glass box station, this reconstruction was designed by regional architect Nigel Wikeley. Two additional side platforms were also abolished.

Sevenoaks is part of the rail franchise which, post-privatisation, was served by Connex South Eastern.  Subsequent to their 'sacking' in 2003 due to poor financial management (although their train operating performance had been very poor), services were operated by South Eastern Trains, a wholly owned subsidiary of the Strategic Rail Authority. On 1 April 2006, Southeastern, owned by Govia, took over management of the station as part of the new Integrated Kent Franchise.

Accidents
7 June 1884 - A double-headed freight train ran into the rear of another freight train at Tub's Hill station. Both crew of the first train were killed. The  signalman was charged with causing their deaths. The trains were being worked under the time interval system.

24 August 1927 - the Sevenoaks railway accident. River class tank locomotive No. 800 River Cray derailed at Shoreham Lane between Dunton Green and Sevenoaks. Thirteen people were killed and 20 were injured. The locomotives were withdrawn and rebuilt as tender locomotives.

Platforms and Services

Platforms
There are two island platforms – 1 & 2, and 3 & 4.
Platform 1 – Northbound fast trains (through Dunton Green) fast to London Bridge, Waterloo East, London Charing Cross and London Cannon Street
Platform 2 – Slow trains starting/terminating at Sevenoaks (through Dunton Green) to London Charing Cross and London Cannon Street via Orpington and Lewisham
Platform 3 – Southbound trains via Tonbridge (destinations are Tunbridge Wells, Hastings, Ashford International, Canterbury and Ramsgate)
Platform 4 – Thameslink trains (through Bat & Ball), which all start/terminate here

Services

The typical off-peak service in trains per hour is:
 2 tph to London Blackfriars via 
 2 tph to  via  (1 semi-fast, 1 stopping)
 1 tph to 
 1 tph to  via 

During the peak hours, the station is served by an additional half-hourly between London Charing Cross and Tunbridge Wells. There are also additional services to and from London Cannon Street and the service to Dover Priory is extended to and from Ramsgate via . In addition, the service to London Blackfriars is extended to and from  via .

Passenger Representation

The not-for-profit Sevenoaks Rail Travellers' Association (SRTA) corresponds and meets with Southeastern Railway, TfL, the DfT, MPs and other relevant parties to represent the interests of passengers using Sevenoaks and stations nearby – Bat & Ball, Dunton Green, Eynsford, Kemsing, Otford, and Shoreham.

References

External links

Buildings and structures in Sevenoaks
Railway stations in Kent
DfT Category B stations
Former South Eastern Railway (UK) stations
Railway stations in Great Britain opened in 1868
Railway stations served by Southeastern
Railway stations served by Govia Thameslink Railway